The 1951 St. Louis Cardinals season was the team's 70th season in St. Louis, Missouri and the 60th season in the National League. The Cardinals went 81–73 during the season and finished 3rd in the National League.

Offseason 
 Prior to 1951 season: Larry Jackson was signed as an amateur free agent by the Cardinals.

Regular season

Season standings

Record vs. opponents

Notable transactions 
 May 14, 1951: Don Bollweg and $15,000 were traded by the Cardinals to the New York Yankees for Billy Johnson.
 June 15, 1951: Joe Garagiola, Dick Cole, Bill Howerton, Howie Pollet, and Ted Wilks were traded by the Cardinals to the Pittsburgh Pirates for Cliff Chambers and Wally Westlake.

Roster

Player stats

Batting

Starters by position 
Note: Pos = Position; G = Games played; AB = At bats; H = Hits; Avg. = Batting average; HR = Home runs; RBI = Runs batted in

Other batters 
Note: G = Games played; AB = At bats; H = Hits; Avg. = Batting average; HR = Home runs; RBI = Runs batted in

Pitching

Starting pitchers 
Note: G = Games pitched; IP = Innings pitched; W = Wins; L = Losses; ERA = Earned run average; SO = Strikeouts

Other pitchers 
Note: G = Games pitched; IP = Innings pitched; W = Wins; L = Losses; ERA = Earned run average; SO = Strikeouts

Relief pitchers 
Note: G = Games pitched; W = Wins; L = Losses; SV = Saves; ERA = Earned run average; SO = Strikeouts

Awards and honors 
 Stan Musial, National League leader, triples. It was the fifth time in his career that he would lead the NL in triples.

Farm system 

LEAGUE CHAMPIONS: Houston, Winston-Salem

References

External links
1951 St. Louis Cardinals at Baseball Reference
1951 St. Louis Cardinals team page at www.baseball-almanac.com

St. Louis Cardinals seasons
Saint Louis Cardinals season
1951 in sports in Missouri